Ignatius Gottfried Kaim was an Austrian chemist.
In his dissertation De metallis dubiis published in 1770 Kaim describes the reduction of manganese oxide with carbon and the formation of a brittle metal. This is the first description of manganese metal several years before the better known synthesis of Johan Gottlieb Gahn in 1774.

References 

 

1746 births
1778 deaths
Austrian chemists
Discoverers of chemical elements